Chaparli (چپرلی) is a grassland on a mountain range between Abbasabad and Oskolou villages. The area is the summer quarter of the Derilou branch of Mohammad Khanlu tribe, which in the wake of White Revolution included 40 households. The number significantly dropped over years and in late 1990s no family migrated to the summer quarter of Chaparli for the lack of experienced shepherds. The trend has somehow reversed in recent years, and about 20 families pitch their tents in the area, albeit mainly for escaping the unpleasantly hot climate of Derilou village.

Chaparli is a prime location for observing, even experiencing, the idyllic life of Arasbaran nomadic tribes. Moreover, the topography provides an excellent sightseeing opportunity. In addition to green mountain ranges, many scenic villages of Kaleybar County and Khoda Afarin County are in full view.

In Chaparli Arasbaran dogs receive due respect

Orhan Pamuk in 2001 Turkish novel, My Name Is Red, gives a vivid description of Turkic people's love-hate attitude towards dogs. Every summer, the real life version of this description is in display in Chaparli. Each family has 2-5 dogs, all with characteristic cropped ears and tails. The dogs are fed generous portions of milk soaked breads. When the sheep herds are brought back for milking near tents, dogs sleep around the camp most of the day. The inhabitants treat the beasts with utter respect, a manner which is loathed by more pious villagers of the region as a pagan act. Between dusk and down dogs regain their vicious character; strangers have to avoid crossing campsite otherwise the attacking dogs cannot be controlled even by their owners. Fending off the dogs by beating is considered an act of aggression towards the owner and should be avoided. In fact most of the feuds between settled villagers and pastoralists is about dogs.

References 

Populated places in Khoda Afarin County
Kurdish settlements in East Azerbaijan Province